Bernard Montgomery (1887–1976) was a British Army general who commanded British forces in World War II. General Montgomery may also refer to:

Alexander Montgomery (died 1785) (c. 1721—1785), Irish General of Volunteers
Richard Mattern Montgomery (1911–1987), U.S. Air Force lieutenant general
Richard Montgomery (1738–1775), British Army major general
Robert Montgomery (British Army officer) (1848–1931), British Army major general
Sonny Montgomery (1920–2006), Mississippi National Guard major general in World War II
Thomas M. Montgomery (born 1941), U.S Army lieutenant general
William Montgomery (Pennsylvania soldier) (1736–1816), Pennsylvania Militia major general
William Reading Montgomery (1801–1871), Union Army brigadier general

See also
Archibald Montgomery-Massingberd (1871–1947), British Army general
Archibald Montgomerie, 11th Earl of Eglinton (1726–1796), British Army general
James Montgomerie (1755–1829), British Army lieutenant general
Attorney General Montgomery (disambiguation)